Cuphea lanceolata, also known as the cigar flower, is an annual herbaceous flowering plant in the genus Cuphea of the family Lythraceae.

Description
It has a branched stem with opposite, narrow, up to 7 cm long leaves. The flowers are tubular, dark-lilac or cherry-red, with six petals. The two upper petals are large and ear-shaped, while the others are quite small. The flowering period extends from June through August. The fruit is a capsule.

Distribution
This species is native to north and central Mexico.

Habitat
This tropical plant prefers hot, humid weather and rich, well drained soils in full sun.

Gallery

References

 Biolib

External links
 Rare Plants

lnceolata